Baizhuang Township is a township of Shenze County, Hebei, China.

Administrative divisions
The township contains the following villages:

Guzhuang Village	() 	
Nanbaizhuang Village 	
Zhongbaizhuang Village	() 	
Beibaizhuang Village 	
Xiaozhiyao Village 	
Gaomiao Village	() 	
Dazhiyao Village	() 	
Nanzhangzhuang Village 	
Xiaobao Village 	
Dabao Village 	
Zaoying Village 	
Xiguluo Village 	
Dongguluo Village 	
Wangjiazhuang Village 	
Duanzhuang Village 	
Nanying Village 	
Beiye Zhuangtou Village
Songjiazhuang Village

See also
List of township-level divisions of Hebei

References

Township-level divisions of Hebei
Shenze County